Salmon Inlet, formerly Salmon Arm, is a fjord branching east from Sechelt Inlet in the British Columbia, Canada. Misery and Sechelt Creeks flow freely into the inlet, while the Clowhom River flows in from the artificial Clowhom Lake, formed by a small hydroelectric power development. Heavily affected by logging and milling operations, the inlet is split almost into two portions by an alluvial fan spreading from the mouth of Sechelt Creek.

See also
Sechelt Inlets Marine Provincial Park

References

Fjords of British Columbia
Sunshine Coast (British Columbia)
Inlets of British Columbia